Amt Usedom-Nord is a collective municipality in the district of Vorpommern-Greifswald, in Mecklenburg-Vorpommern, Germany. The seat of the Amt is in Zinnowitz.

The Amt Usedom-Nord consists of the following municipalities:
 Karlshagen
 Mölschow
 Peenemünde
 Trassenheide
 Zinnowitz

Usedom Nord